The Cold War was a college ice hockey game played between U.S. college rivals Michigan State University and the University of Michigan on Saturday, October 6, 2001. It set a then-world record for the largest crowd at an ice hockey game with 74,544.

Longtime rivals with the University of Michigan in hockey (and other sports), MSU decided not to play this contest at East Lansing's Munn Ice Arena, but instead set up the ice rink in the middle of the much larger Spartan Stadium, which they filled to 103.4% capacity. This meant that 74,544  packed the Big Ten football stadium (the home of the MSU football team) to watch the MSU Spartans and the U-M Wolverines skate to a 3–3 tie. Two 300-piece marching bands were present on field and the game was internationally televised. Country artist Shannon Brown sang during the second intermission.

Game summary

Number in parenthesis represents the player's total in goals or assists to that point of the season

Shots by period

Power play opportunities

MVP selections

Team rosters

 Kevin O'Malley and Matt Migliaccio dressed as the back-up goaltenders. Neither entered the game.

Officials 
 Referees —Steve Piotrowski
 Linesmen — John LaDuke and Kevin Langseth

Record surpassed
The opening game of the 2010 IIHF World Championship took place on May 7 at the retractable-roof Veltins-Arena, normally used by the soccer club Schalke 04. On this occasion, the stadium's configuration allowed for a capacity of 75,976, which would ultimately be exceeded by almost 2,000, breaking the all-time attendance record.

On December 11, 2010, the two teams involved in the Cold War met again, this time with Michigan hosting the game at its football venue, Michigan Stadium. UM billed the game as "The Big Chill at the Big House Presented by Arby's". When UM halted ticket sales to the general public on May 6, 2010, over 100,000 tickets had been sold. As of the 2010 football season, Michigan Stadium had an official capacity of 109,901. The game ended with a 5–0 victory for the University of Michigan. The record was officially set at 104,173 people.

Television
The game was broadcast by FSN Detroit, which made it available nationally. The announcers were Matt Shepard, Billy Jaffe and Shireen Saski. John Keating hosted a pregame show.

See also
List of outdoor ice hockey games
List of ice hockey games with highest attendance

References

Michigan Wolverines men's ice hockey
Michigan State Spartans ice hockey
Outdoor ice hockey games
2001–02 NCAA Division I men's ice hockey season
October 2001 sports events in the United States